Poker Night, released in the UK as The Joker, is a 2014 crime thriller film that was written and directed by Greg Francis. The film was released to video on demand on 5 December 2014 and had a limited theatrical release on 20 December. Filmed in British Columbia, Poker Night centers upon a rookie detective that decides to attend an annual poker night held by veteran police officers, where each one details how they captured a murder suspect.

Plot

Stan Jeter (Beau Mirchoff) is a new detective who gets invited to play a game of poker with several veteran police officers and detectives. Each one tells Stan about various insights they gained from different murder cases they investigated, which turns out to be invaluable when Stan is captured and imprisoned by a vicious, anonymous assailant (Michael Eklund). He finds that he has been imprisoned with Amy (Halston Sage), the daughter of a police officer, and that he must use the stories of his fellow poker players to find a way for both himself and Amy to escape.

Cast
Beau Mirchoff as Stan Jeter
Ron Perlman as Calabrese
Giancarlo Esposito as Bernard
Corey William Large as Davis
Titus Welliver as Maxwell
Halston Sage as Amy
Ron Eldard as Cunningham
Michael Eklund as The Man
Kieran Large as Shawn Allen

Release

Home media
Poker Night was released on DVD and Blu-ray by Xlrator on February 10, 2015.

Critical response
On review aggregator Rotten Tomatoes, Poker Night holds an approval rating of 50%, based on 10 reviews, and an average rating of 5.39/10. On Metacritic, the film has a weighted average score of 35 out of 100, based on 5 critics, indicating "generally unfovorable reviews".

Dennis Harvey of Variety gave the film a negative review, writing, "Poker Night offers a near-indigestible mix of tricky Pulp Fiction-esque structural convolution, torture-porn tropes and a somewhat distasteful level of snark, making for a self-satisfied puzzle that most viewers will run out of patience trying to unravel." Martin Tsai from Los Angeles Times offered the film similar criticism, stating that the film "brings to mind so many forgettable thrillers from the 1990s, films that aimed to impress stylistically but ultimately were met with indifference." Frank Scheck of The Hollywood Reporter, although commending the film's acting, and "somewhat anthology feel", criticized the endless voiceover narration,  "jumbled timeline", and devolving to genre tropes. Scheck concluded his review by writing, "Although it features plenty of entertaining moments along the way, in the end Poker Night feels like a cheat." Patrick Cooper from Bloody Disgusting felt that the film showed promise and featured good performances, but was ruined by its nonlinear narrative, and inconsitant tone.

The film was not without its supporters. 
Matt Donato from We Got This Covered awarded the film three and a half out of five stars, writing, "Poker Night is a "wild card" watch, but Greg Francis flashes a winning hand by making a memorable monster out of Michael Eklund." Matt Molgaard from HorrorFreakNews rated the film a similar three and a half out of five stars, writing, "Poker Night may not satisfy those in search of the goriest film of the year, but anyone up for a unique viewing experience, a strong cast and a damn sharp villain are going to find Poker Night to be more than simply adequate." Matt Boiselle of Dread Central gave the film four out of five stars, commending the film's performances, interwoven stories, and villain.

References

External links
 
 
 
 

2014 films
2014 crime thriller films
2014 independent films
American crime thriller films
American independent films
Films about kidnapping
2014 directorial debut films
2010s English-language films
2010s American films